Millettia macrophylla is a species of plant in the family Fabaceae. It is found in Cameroon, Equatorial Guinea, and Nigeria. Its natural habitat is subtropical or tropical moist lowland forests. It is threatened by habitat loss.

References

macrophylla
Flora of Cameroon
Flora of Equatorial Guinea
Flora of Nigeria
Vulnerable plants
Taxonomy articles created by Polbot